Bruno Vieira Gallo de Oliveira (born 7 May 1988, in Niterói), or simply Bruno Gallo, is a Brazilian footballer who plays as a central midfielder for Volta Redonda.

References

External links
 
 
 CBF
 netvasco

1988 births
Living people
Sportspeople from Niterói
Brazilian footballers
Brazilian expatriate footballers
CR Vasco da Gama players
Leixões S.C. players
Vitória F.C. players
Resende Futebol Clube players
C.S. Marítimo players
Qatar SC players
G.D. Chaves players
Bruno Gallo
Club Deportivo Palestino footballers
Volta Redonda FC players
Categorý:Campeonato Brasileiro Série B players
Primeira Liga players
Liga Portugal 2 players
Categorý:Campeonato Brasileiro Série A players
Qatar Stars League players
Bruno Gallo
Chilean Primera División players
Campeonato Brasileiro Série C players
Brazilian expatriate sportspeople in Portugal
Brazilian expatriate sportspeople in Qatar
Brazilian expatriate sportspeople in Thailand
Brazilian expatriate sportspeople in Chile
Expatriate footballers in Portugal
Expatriate footballers in Qatar
Expatriate footballers in Thailand
Expatriate footballers in Chile
Association football midfielders